Daimler Halt was a railway halt in Coventry, England, built by the London and North Western Railway in 1917 and closed in 1965.

It was unusual in that it was built solely for use of employees of the Daimler Company. It became a public station in 1956.  There were no station buildings with the exception of rain shelters on the platforms.

References

Warwickshire Railways: Daimler Halt Station
British History Online: Coventry Communications

Disused railway stations in Coventry
Beeching closures in England
Railway stations in Great Britain opened in 1917
Railway stations in Great Britain closed in 1965
Former London and North Western Railway stations